Rudolph Hennig (May 5, 1886 – February 28, 1969) was a politician from Alberta, Canada. He served in the Legislative Assembly of Alberta from 1926 to 1935 as a member of the United Farmers of Alberta.

Political career
Hennig first ran for the Legislative Assembly of Alberta in the 1926 Alberta general election. He stood as the United Farmers candidate in the electoral district of Victoria.  He defeated former Liberal MLA Francis Walker and three other candidates.

Upon redistribution of districts in 1930, Hennig sought re-election in the new district of Clover Bar in that year's election. He defeated independent candidate Christian Hein in the second vote count.

Shortly before the 1935 election, he lost the UFA nomination in Clover Bar to David Roberts. He chose to retire at dissolution of the assembly rather than contesting the election as an independent.

Honors
The University of Alberta awarded Hennig an honorary degree in 1965.  École Rudolph Hennig School, a French immersion elementary and Junior High School in Fort Saskatchewan, Alberta, was named in his honor.

References

External links
Alberta Legislature Membership Listing

1886 births
1969 deaths
People from Kishinyovsky Uyezd
Emigrants from the Russian Empire to Canada
Moldovan emigrants to Canada
United Farmers of Alberta MLAs
University of Alberta alumni